Mirasierra is an administrative neighborhood of Madrid belonging to the district of Fuencarral-El Pardo. Mirasierra was founded in 1953.

Wards of Madrid
Fuencarral-El Pardo

Public transport

Bus 

Mirasierra is connected by a large bus network. The following lines give service to Mirasierra: 

 Line 49: Plaza de Castilla - Pitis

 Line 133: Callao - Mirasierra

 Line 134: Plaza de Castilla - Montecarmelo

 Line 178: Plaza de Castilla - Montecarmelo

 Night bus line 23: Cibeles - Montecarmelo

Metro 

The neighborhood is served by the lines 7 and 9: 
 Line 7 has three stations: Lacoma, Arroyofresno and Pitis

 Line 9 has two stations: Mirasierra and Paco de Lucía

Also there is a nearby station in Montecarmelo neighborhood

Train 

Mirasierra is served by the lines C-3a, C-7 and C-8 of Cercanias Madrid with two stations: Pitis (connection with line 7 of metro) and Mirasierra - Paco de Lucía (connection with line 9 of metro in Paco de Lucía station)